James McKnight may refer to:

 James McKnight (American football) (born 1972), American football wide receiver
 James McKnight (footballer) (1889–1920), Irish footballer
 James Stuart McKnight (1884–1950), National Guard officer and member of the City Council in Los Angeles, California
 Jim McKnight (1936–1994), American baseball player

See also
 James MacKnight (1721–1800), Scottish minister and theological author
 James MacKnight (agrarian reformer), Irish journalist and agrarian reformer